Farouk Muhammad Lawan  (born 6 July 1962) is a Nigerian politician and four-term (since 1999) member of the House of Representatives for the Bagwai/Shanono Federal Constituency of Kano State.

Education and personal life
Lawan is a graduate of Bayero University in Kano. He is married with four children.

Political career
A People's Democratic Party (PDP) member, Lawan was  elected in 1999, 2003, 2007 and again in 2011, making it 4 times elected member. Lawan was the Chairman of the House Committee on Finance under the former Speaker Aminu Bello Masari. He identifies his legislative interests as "Appropriation, Information and Education".

During the late-2007 corruption scandal that caused the former Speaker of the House Patricia Etteh to resign, Lawan led the Integrity Group, an alliance of Representatives opposed to Etteh.

Fuel subsidy scandal
In January 2012, Lawan chaired the House of Representatives committee that investigated the Nigerian government's fuel subsidies. The committee was set up in the wake of nationwide strikes in Nigeria after President Goodluck Jonathan removed a fuel subsidy. This resulted in the increase in price of fuel. The committee's report released in April the same year revealed a huge scam in which Nigerian fuel companies were being paid hundreds of millions of dollars in subsidies by the government for fuel that was never delivered. It was estimated the scam cost the country $6.8 million.

In February 2013, Lawan was charged with corruption after he allegedly accepted $500,000 from Femi Otedola, a Nigerian billionaire oil tycoon, as part of a $3 million bribe Lawan had solicited from Otedola. Otedola claimed that Lawan demanded the bribe in order to have his company, Zenon, removed from the list of companies that the committee had implicated in the scandal. The initial fuel subsidy report said that Zenon owed more than $1 million to the government, but legislators later voted to remove the firm from the final report. Lawan said that he accepted the money in order to expose blackmail and informed the committee and Economic and Financial Crimes Commission (EFCC) about it.

On 22 June 2021, the trial of Farouk Lawan came to a logical conclusion as the judge, Angela Otaluka, sentenced the former federal lawmaker to seven years in prison.

Otaluka, a judge of the High Court of the Federal Capital Territory (FCT), Apo, Abuja, who jailed Lawan for corruptly demanding $3 million and eventually taking $500,000 bribe while serving as the chairman of the House of Representatives’ ad-hoc committee investigating the fraud around fuel subsidy in 2012.

In her judgment, Otaluka relied heavily on the testimony of Otedola, who described giving the $500,000 to Lawan in a sting operation planned with the State Security Service (SSS) to obtain evidence of extortion against the lawmaker. He went to the court of appeal and the sentencing was reduced to five years.

References

Living people
1962 births
People from Kano
Politicians from Kano State
Nigerian businesspeople
Members of the House of Representatives (Nigeria)
Peoples Democratic Party members of the House of Representatives (Nigeria)
Bayero University Kano alumni